The 2004 Individual Speedway Junior World Championship was the 28th edition of the World motorcycle speedway Under-21 Championships.

The final was won by Robert Miśkowiak of the Poland.

World final
September 11, 2004
 Wrocław, Olympic Stadium

References

2004
World I J
2004 in Polish speedway
Speedway competitions in Poland